Ariyalur is a town and district headquarters of Ariyalur district in the South Indian state of Tamil Nadu and is rich in limestone, surrounded with seven cement factories and two sugar factories.
 
Ariyalur was a part of the erstwhile Trichirapally District until India's independence in 1947 and Tiruchirappalli district until 1995, Perambalur district until 2007 and subsequently a part of the newly formed Ariyalur district. The town is a part of the fertile Cauvery Delta and the major profession in the town is agriculture.

Ariyalur is administered by a municipality established in 1994. Ariyalur comes under the Ariyalur assembly constituency which elects a member to the Tamil Nadu Legislative Assembly once every five years and it is a part of the Chidambaram constituency which elects its Member of Parliament (MP) once in five years. Roadways are the major mode of transportation to the town and it also has rail connectivity which acts as a main station after Tiruchirappalli junction.

History

Ariyalur is one of the most important places for the Chozha Dynasty. Vallavarayan Vandhiyadevan home town is Ariyalur. The late Cholas made Gangai Konda Cholapuram as their capital.

After the Chozha dynasty, Vijayanagar Nayak kings ruled and built many temples in Ariyalur Kothandaramar temple.

In 1741 the Marathas invaded Tiruchirappalli and took Chanda Saheb as captive. Chanda Saheb succeeded in securing freedom in 1748 and soon got involved in a famous war for the Nawabs place in the Carnatic against Anwardeen, the Nawab of Arcot and his son Mohammed Ali.

Mohammed Ali annexed the two palayams of Ariyalur and Udayarpalayam located with troops were in the Ariyalur district on the grounds of default in the payment of Tributes and failure to assist him in quelling the rebellion of Yusuf Khan. In November 1764, Mohammed Ali represented the issue to Madras Council and obtained military assistance on 3 January 1765. The forces led by Umdat-Ul-Umara and Donald Campbell entered Ariyalur and captured it. The young Poligar together with his followers thereupon fled to Udayarpalayam. On 19 January the army marched upon Udayarpalayam. The Poligar's troops were defeated and the playams were occupied. The two poligars fled their town and took refuge in Tharangampadi, then a Danish Settlement. The annexation of the palayam gave the Navab uninterrupted possession of all his territories extending Arcot to Tiruchirapalli.

The history followed was a power struggle between Hyder Ali and later Tipu Sultan with the British. After the death of Tipu Sultan the English took the civil and military Administration of the Carnatic in 1801. Thus Tiruchirappalli came into the hands of the English and the District was formed in 1801.

Geography
Ariyalur is a municipality and headquarters of Ariyalur District in the state of Tamil Nadu. It is rich in limestone resources.

Climate
Ariyalur has a hot semi-arid climate (Köppen BSh). Temperatures are hot to sweltering throughout the year, and especially unpleasant during the wet season under the northeast monsoon from October to December. The rain shadow of the Western Ghats means that Ariyalur receives very limited rainfall during the southwest monsoon, but the city is likewise too far inland to receive sufficient northeast monsoon rainfall to be a tropical wet and dry climate.

Economy
Big industrial houses like Birlas (UltraTech Cement), India Cements, Dalmia Cement, Madras Cement have their cement units here. Tamil Nadu government's TANCEM factory is in Ariyalur and is the first factory to establish the cement production in ariyalur.

Sugar cane is grown as a major commercial crop. One private sugar factory near Keelapalur is functioning in the district with a capacity of crushing 3,000 Tonnes per day.
One of the main crops in Ariyalur district is cashew. The pre-dominate soil in the district is red sanding with scattered Packers of black soil.
This town consists mainly of glade soil. The soil in the district is best suited for raising dry crops. Rice also grown in some places.

Administration and politics

The municipality of Ariyalur was established as a second grade town panchayat from 1943 during British rule. It was promoted to a first grade town panchyat in 1995, to a second grade in 1966 and a special grade in October 2004. Jayankondam is the first Municipality in Ariyalur district. During December 2004, it was promoted to a third grade municipality. The functions of the municipality is devolved into six departments: General, Engineering, Revenue, Public Health, Town planning and the Computer Wing. All these departments are under the control of a Municipal Commissioner who is the supreme executive head. The legislative powers are vested in a body of 18 members, one each from the 18 wards. The legislative body is headed by an elected Chairperson assisted by a Deputy Chairperson. The municipality had an estimated income of 75,917,000 and an estimated expenditure of 63,703,000 for the year 2012–13.

Ariyalur comes under the Ariyalur State Assembly Constituency and it elects a member to the Tamil Nadu Legislative Assembly once every five years. The current Member of Legislative Assembly (MLA) of the constituency since 2021 is K. Chinnappa from the DMK Party.

Ariyalur is a part of the Chidambaram Lok Sabha constituency and elects a member to the Lok Sabha, the lower house of the Parliament of India, once every five years. The current Member of Parliament from the constituency is Thol.Thirumavalavan from the DMK party.

Demographics

According to 2011 census, Ariyalur had a population of 28,902 with a sex-ratio of 1,014 females for every 1,000 males, much above the national average of 929. A total of 2,977 were under the age of six years, constituting 1,538 males and 1,439 females. Scheduled Castes and Scheduled Tribes accounted for 11.26% and 0.03% of the population respectively. The average literacy of the town was 76.04%, compared to the national average of 72.99%. The town had a total of 7,319 households. There were a total of 10,283 workers, comprising 315 cultivators, 670 main agricultural labourers, 298 in house hold industries, 7,165 other workers, 1,835 marginal workers, 159 marginal cultivators, 175 marginal agricultural labourers, 150 marginal workers in household industries and 1,351 other marginal workers. As of 2008, there were a total of eight notified slums, with 5,907 comprising 21% of the total population residing in those. As per the religious census of 2011, Ariyalur had 80.55% Hindus, 4.61% Muslims, 3.81% Christians, 10.02% Sikhs, 0.01% Buddhists, 0.01% Jains, 0.97% following other religions and 0.01% following no religion or did not indicate any religious preference.

Utility services
Electricity supply to Ariyalur is regulated and distributed by the Tamil Nadu Electricity Board (TNEB). The town along with its suburbs forms the Trichy Electricity Distribution Circle. Water supply is provided by the municipality of Ariyalur from Kollidam river through three schemes with head works of two of them located at Thirumanur. In the period 2010–2011, a total of 2.3 million litres of water was supplied everyday for households in the town. There are three bore wells and 356 water fountains in the town that serves as the source of groundwater. About 11 metric tonnes of solid waste are collected from Ariyalur every day by door-to-door collection out of the 15 metric tonnes generated and subsequently the source segregation and dumping is carried out by the sanitary department of the municipality. The coverage of solid waste management had an efficiency of 73% as of 2001. There is limited underground drainage system in the town and the major sewerage system for disposal of sullage is through septic tanks, open drains and public conveniences. There is a government hospital and twelve private hospitals and clinics that take care of the healthcare needs of the citizens. There are a total of 1,501 street lamps in Ariyalur: 361 sodium lamps, 1,139 tube lights and one high mast beam lamp. The municipality operates one fish and meat market that has 46 shops and a weekly market that cater to the needs of the town and the rural areas around it.

Transportation

The National Highway NH136 connects Perambalur and Thanjavur, passes through Ariyalur, State Highways SH143 - Ariyalur- Thungapuram - Thittakudi and SH139 Ariyalur - Rettipalayan are the major roads via Ariyalur. The town has  concrete roads,  BT roads,  of WBM roads and  earthen roads. A total of 452 roads is maintained by the State Highways Department. Ariyalur is served by town bus service, which provides connectivity within the town and the suburbs. There are private operated mini-bus services that cater to the local transport needs of the town. The town has a B-class bus stand located in the heart of the town. There are regular inter-city bus services to Ariyalur. The Tamil Nadu State Transport Corporation operates daily services connecting various cities to Ariyalur. The major inter city bus routes from the town are to cities and towns like Trichy, Chidambaram, Jayankondam, Perambalur and Thanjavur. Ariyalur railway station is located on the line between the state capital Chennai and Trichy and is well connected by rail to major towns like Madurai and Tirunelveli.

Ariyalur railway station is a major railway station on chord line connecting Chennai and Tiruchirappalli. Several daily trains such as Pallavan Express, Rockfort Express, Pearl City Express, Vaigai Express, Guruvayur Express ,Mangalore Express, sethu expressetc. connect Ariyalur with Chennai Egmore and Tiruchirappalli Junction.

See also
Vadaveekam

References

Sources

External links
https://web.archive.org/web/20091102195707/http://municipality.tn.gov.in/Ariyalur/

Cities and towns in Ariyalur district
Palayam